"Roll with It" is a song recorded by Steve Winwood for his album of the same name, released on Virgin Records. It was written by Winwood and songwriter Will Jennings. Publishing rights organization BMI later had Motown songwriters Holland-Dozier-Holland credited with co-writing the song due to its resemblance to the Junior Walker hit "(I'm a) Roadrunner".

The song was the last #1 hit of Casey Kasem's 18-year run as the original host of American Top 40 (he would return to host the program 10 years later), as well as being the first #1 song of Shadoe Stevens' hosting tenure. The 1990 movie Nuns on the Run also made use of the song.

Release and reception
The single spent four weeks at No. 1 on the Billboard Hot 100 singles chart in the summer of 1988. It topped the Billboard adult contemporary chart for two weeks, and also spent four weeks at No. 1 on the Billboard mainstream rock chart. In addition, the song reached No. 30 on the R&B chart. In the United Kingdom, the song reached No. 53 on the UK Singles Chart.

"Roll with It" was nominated for two Grammy Awards in 1989, Record of the Year and Best Male Pop Vocal performance. The album Roll with It was also nominated as Album of the Year.

Music video
The music video, directed by David Fincher and filmed in sepia-tone, depicts Winwood performing the song in a bar.

Track listing 

7": Virgin / VS 1085 United Kingdom
 "Roll With It" - 4:30
 "The Morning Side" - 3:57

7": Virgin / 7-99326 United States
 "Roll With It" - 4:30
 "The Morning Side" - 5:12

12" and CD Single: Virgin / VST 1085, VSCD 1085  United Kingdom
 "Roll With It" (12" Remix) - 9:56
 "The Morning Side" - 3:57
 "Roll With It" (7" Remix) - 4:30

 Track 1 remixed by Bruce Forest and Frank Heller

12": Virgin / 7 96648-0 United States
 "Roll With It" (12" Remix) - 9:53
 "Roll With It" (Steve Testifies Dub) - 6:44
 "The Morning Side" (7" Version) - 3:57

Personnel 
 Steve Winwood – lead and backing vocals, acoustic piano, Hammond organ, Fairlight programming, bass guitar, drums
 Mike Lawler – keyboards
 The Memphis Horns
 Wayne Jackson – trombone and trumpet 
 Andrew Love – tenor saxophone and solo
 Tessa Niles – backing vocals
 Mark Williamson – backing vocals

Charts

Year-end charts

All-time charts

References

External links
Single release info at discogs.com

1988 songs
1988 singles
Steve Winwood songs
Billboard Hot 100 number-one singles
Cashbox number-one singles
RPM Top Singles number-one singles
Music videos directed by David Fincher
Songs with lyrics by Will Jennings
Songs written by Steve Winwood
Songs written by Holland–Dozier–Holland
Virgin Records singles